The 2002 SEAT Open was a women's tennis tournament played on indoor hard courts in Kockelscheuer, Luxembourg which was part of Tier III of the 2002 WTA Tour. It was the 7th edition of the tournament and was held from 21 October until 27 October 2002. First-seeded Kim Clijsters won the singles title, her second consecutive title at the event and third in total, and earned $35,000 first-prize money.

Finals

Singles

 Kim Clijsters defeated  Magdalena Maleeva, 6–1, 6–2
 This was Clijsters' 3rd singles title of the year and the 9th of her career.

Doubles

 Kim Clijsters /  Janette Husárová defeated  Květa Peschke /  Barbara Rittner, 4–6, 6–3, 7–5

References

External links
 ITF tournament edition details
 Tournament draws

SEAT Luxembourg Open
Luxembourg Open
2002 in Luxembourgian tennis